Bill Ashton is a South African cartoonist and gallery owner.

Career
Bill has gained notoriety for his surrealistic acrylic on canvas landscapes as well as the portraits that he has produced since becoming a full-time artist in 1985. Working in White River in Mpumalanga, South Africa, Bill's recent World War II Fighter Aircraft and wildlife paintings have endeared him to many art connoisseurs in and around South Africa. His paintings demonstrate his feel and understanding of the tactile essence and vibrancy that exists in these subject matters.

External links
Bill Ashton
Example of Ashton's art
Speech
Example of Ashton's art

South African artists
Year of birth missing (living people)
Living people